The New Caledonian sea krait (Laticauda saintgironsi) is a species of venomous snake in the subfamily Laticaudinae of the family Elapidae. The species is native to the waters around New Caledonia.

Etymology
The specific name, saintgironsi, is in honor of French herpetologist Hubert Saint Girons.

Geographic range
L. saintgironsi is endemic to New Caledonia, including the Loyalty Islands. It is very rarely found outside of its native range (one specimen was found in New Zealand in 1925), likely due to Laticauda species tending to spend time onshore or in shallow water, limiting their chance to encounter oceanic currents.

Habitat

Description
L. saintgironsi exhibits sexual dimorphism, with females growing larger than males. The upper lip is yellow or cream-colored, and the rostral scale is undivided. Specimens can be identified by this yellow upper lip, which is present in both this species and the Yellow-lipped sea krait, and the presence of 21 rows of mid-body scales, compared to the yellow-lipped sea krait's 23 banded rows that meet ventrally.

Diet
The diet of L. saintgironsi consists of non-spiny anguilliform fishes, with the lipspot moray Gymnothorax chilospilus representing about half of the prey.

Parasites
Only a few parasites have been recorded for the New Caledonian sea krait, including camallanid nematodes.

Reproduction
L. saintgironsi is oviparous.

References

Snakes of New Caledonia
Laticauda
Reptiles described in 2006